Ghazi Salahuddin (born 1939) (Urdu: غازى صلاح الدين), is a Pakistani journalist, writer, literary figure, and the scholar of political science.
He is brother of renowned educationist and Pakistan’s first woman to do PhD in nuclear physics, Dr. Aquila Islam and father of journalist Aliya Salahuddin.

Career
He has written various analytical columns, both in Urdu and English, in the News International, Daily Jang and has often appeared on Geo Television for independent commentary on Pakistan's current affairs.

He studied and graduated from the Karachi University. In addition, he served as the President of the Karachi Press Club in 2006.

Seminar by journalists
In 2018, on World Press Freedom Day, a seminar was organized on the topic of 'Electronic media in Pakistan: challenges and issues' at the Shaheed Zulfikar Ali Bhutto Institute of Science and Technology (Szabist) in Karachi where many journalists participated including Ghazi Salahuddin, Mazhar Abbas, Imtiaz Alam, P. J. Mir and others.

Awards and recognition
Pride of Performance Award by the President of Pakistan in 2017.

References

External links
Young writers' works, creative flair praised - Dawn (newspaper)

Pakistani columnists
Pakistani scholars
Muhajir people
Pakistani male journalists
University of Karachi alumni
Academic staff of the University of Karachi
Pakistani activists
Living people
Pakistani television hosts
Journalists from Karachi
Writers from Karachi
Geo News newsreaders and journalists
1939 births
Recipients of the Pride of Performance